James L. Fields was an American sound engineer. He was nominated for two Academy Awards in the category Best Sound Recording. He worked on 400 films over a period of 45 years.

Selected filmography
 The Gold Rush (1942 re-release)
 So This Is Washington (1943)

References

External links

Year of birth missing
Year of death missing
American audio engineers